The 4th Armored Division was a short-lived armoured unit of the French Army. Formed on 10 May 1940 on the battlefield, it comprised mainly tank battalions. It fought without interruption for forty days and was initially commanded by Charles de Gaulle.

Battle Of France

Formation
The division was formed under Colonel De Gaulle on 15 May 1940.

Fighting The Blitzkrieg
The 4DCr launched an attack on 17 May at the Battle of Montcornet, where it successfully threw back the German defenses but had to retreat on its starting positions for lack of support and air cover. It then moved south of Abbeville to attack German bridgeheads across the Aisne river, fighting the Battle of Abbeville on 28/29 May with the aim of breaking through to the encircled Allied units trapped in Dunkirk.

On 1 June, the 4e DCr was relieved by the 51st (Highland) Infantry Division and regrouped at Marseille-en-Beauvaisis to attach itself to the armoured group under General Charles Delestraint. On 6 June, De Gaulle was relieved of his command to rejoin his new commission as State under-secretary for War in the government. De Gaulle was replaced by Colonel Chaudesolle for one day. General Pierre Jules de la Font took command of the division on 7 June.

On 10 June, the armoured group was attached to the Paris Army, and on 12 June, the division was assigned to the 10th Army Corps. From then on, it took part in rear-guard fights during the retreat, notably on the Loire river from 12 to 19 June, and until the cease-fire on 26 June.

Composition 
The division was composed of the following units:
 46e bataillon de chars de combat
 19e bataillon de chars de combat
 4e bataillon de chasseurs portés
 24e bataillon de chars de combat
 303e régiment d'artillerie tractée
 4e groupe autonome d'artillerie
 322e RATTT / 1er groupe (from 17 May)
 322e RATTT / 2e groupe (from 17 May)
 10e régiment de cuirassiers - One squadron equipped with the Panhard 178 (from 18 May)
 3e cuirassiers / 1er groupe d'escadron - One squadron equipped with SOMUA S35 tanks (from 18 May)
 10/80e BDAC (from 20 May)
 11/86e BDAC (from 20 May)
 47e bataillon de chars de combat (from 21 May)
 44e bataillon de chars de combat (from 21 May)
 44e bataillon de chars de combat (from 21 May)
 1020e batterie, 404e DCA (from 23 May)
 305e RATTT / 1er groupe (105) (from 23 May)
 2e bataillon du 7e régiment de dragons portés (from 24 May)
 3e cuirassiers / 2e groupe d'escadron - One squadron equipped with Hotchkiss H35 tanks (from 25 May)
 665e batterie divisionnaire antichar (from 25 May)
 51e batterie antichar autonome (from 25 May)
 661e batterie divisionnaire antichar (from 28 May)

Equipment 
The division was equipped with the following vehicles:
 58 Char B1bis heavy tanks
 44  Char D2 medium tanks
 135 SOMUA S35 medium tanks
 40 Hotchkiss H39 light tanks
 48 Panhard 178 armoured cars

Bibliography 
 
 

French World War II divisions
Armored divisions of France
Military units and formations established in 1940
Military units and formations disestablished in 1940